Citybook VII: Kings River Bridge is a fantasy role-playing game supplement published by Flying Buffalo in 1997.

Contents
Citybook VII: Kings River Bridge was part of the Catalyst  line of game supplements.

Each book in the series, which began with CityBook: Butcher, Baker, Candlestick maker, presents a fictional business in a fantasy game world including a layout for the establishment, description, characters associated with that business and potential plot hooks. The series is designed to help Game Masters (GMs) populate their towns and cities rather than having to make them all from scratch.

The remaining books in the series focused on specific parts of town, such as fancy establishments, the seedy side of town, port city-specific locations and more. King's River Bridge details the businesses and characters that service or are near the city's river bridge.

Rather than being tied to one role-playing system, the CityBook series was a generic fantasy supplement with information that allowed its characters to be easily converted or created in any fantasy role-playing game. As such, it is still a usable supplement even though the game systems that existed when it was published have changed rules a few times.

Entries within the book are:

The Royal Tax Collector by Joseph Formichella

The Halfling Rat Catchers' Guild by James L. Walker

Mildred Al Hassan's Messengers by Don Webb

Mother Footcandle's Oil Shack by S. John Ross

The Street Cleaner by Beth Hannan Rimmels

The River Raptors by Don Webb

The Poets' Guild Training Centre by Wayne West

The Bridge Guard by Bill Kerr

Sweeney's Pie Shoppe by Bear Peters

Dirty Joe's Tavern by Anita

The Fellowship of the Moon by Seng Mah

Ron & Don's Chat & Chew by Don Webb

The Confection Connection by Kevin Crossman

Orada's Fruit Cart by Mike Keller

Adaro's Stew Cart by Mike Keller

The Guzzling Gargoyle by Joseph Formichella

Helani's Fine Timepieces by Brent Stroh

Tunki's Other Wear by Norma Blair

Blind Geoffrey's Barberie and Cauterie by S. John Ross

Skinhold's Boat Rental by Joseph Formichella

The Clothes Chest by Lisa Walker

Teeble's Found-Goods Warehouse by S. John Ross

Neela's Flower Cart by Deborah Christian

The Cornerstone Ghost by Richard Shaffstall

Fizhak's Waifs by Brent Stroh

Bridge Encounters: Zachary Smithe and Chaunce Teller by Bill Kerr

Bridge Encounters: Marla Adelwine, Keelat Angelo, Shecky Reenstein, Thomas Roe and Mary the Street Poet by Don Webb

Publication history
City Book VII: King's River Bridge (1997) was prepared by Archer Books and Games, and saw print after a three-year hiatus on the City Book line, and was also the final original role-playing game supplement that Flying Buffalo published for several years. Citybook VII: Kings River Bridge was the last of Flying Buffalo's  All-Systems Catalyst Supplements  for role-playing games. The 112-page book was edited by Debora Kerr. 

Authors: 
 Norma Blair 
 Deborah Christian 
 Kevin Crossman 
 Joe Formichella 
 Beth Hannan Rimmels 
 Mike Keller 
 William Kerr 
 Seng Mah 
 Anita Martinez 
 Jim "Bear" Peters 
 S. John Ross 
 Richard Shaffstall 
 Brent Stroh 
 Lisa Walker 
 James L. Walker 
 Don Webb 
 Wayne West

Artists: 
 Steven S. Crompton
 Liz Danforth
 Jeff Menges
 Tonia Walden
 Miguel Heredia
 Eric Shock
 Paula Schricker
 Chris Wood

Reception

Reviews
Pyramid #25 (May/June, 1997)

References

Further reading
 Flying Buffalo, Inc.
 RPG Geek review 
 RPG.net review 

Fantasy role-playing game supplements
Role-playing game supplements introduced in 1997